The Diva Book of Short Stories (2001)  and its successor Groundswell: The Second Diva Book of Short Stories (2002)  are anthologies  of fictional short stories about lesbian, gay, bisexual, and transgender people.

The Diva Book of Short Stories, edited by Helen Sandler, was the first book in the series.  It was critically well-received, winning the 2002 Lambda Literary Award for fictional anthology.

References

2001 anthologies
2002 anthologies
Fiction anthologies
LGBT anthologies
Lambda Literary Award-winning works
LGBT literature in the United States